Diplostephium macrocephalum is a species of flowering plant in the family Asteraceae. It is found only in Ecuador. Its natural habitats are subtropical or tropical moist montane forests, subtropical or tropical dry shrubland, subtropical or tropical high-altitude shrubland, and subtropical or tropical high-altitude grassland. It is threatened by habitat loss.

References

macrocephalum
Flora of Ecuador
Near threatened plants
Taxonomy articles created by Polbot